Lorna Doone is a 1934 British historical drama film directed by Basil Dean and starring Victoria Hopper, John Loder and Margaret Lockwood. It is based on the 1869 novel Lorna Doone by R. D. Blackmore. This was the third screen version of the novel, and the first with sound; a further cinema adaptation followed in 1951.

It was shot partly on location in Somerset. The film's sets were designed by the art director Edward Carrick.

Cast
 Victoria Hopper as Lorna Doone
 John Loder as John Ridd
 Margaret Lockwood as Annie Ridd
 Roy Emerton as Carver Doone
 Mary Clare as Mistress Sara Ridd
 Edward Rigby as Reuben 'Uncle Ben' Huckaback
 Roger Livesey as Tom Faggus
 George Curzon as King James II
 D. A. Clarke-Smith as Counsellor Doone
 Laurence Hanray as Parson Bowden
 Amy Veness as Betty Muxworthy
 Eliot Makeham as John Fry
 Wyndham Goldie as Chief Judge Jeffries
 Frank Cellier as Captain Jeremy Stickles
 Herbert Lomas as Sir Ensor Doone
 Arthur Hambling as Soldier

Critical reception
In a contributor to The New York Times commented that it is "has scored no more of a success on its London showing than did The Dictator. Cynics say that the choice of subject and scenario is not all the battle, and that until British producers realize that in the making of pictures the chief essential is not to be dull, Elstree will trail a long, long way behind Hollywood in the best selling markets of the word". The Radio Times noted "Margaret Lockwood, in her screen debut, is a ravishing beauty. The story still holds water, even if the acting and the techniques of 1934 may leak a bit".

References

Bibliography
 Newland, Paul. British Rural Landscapes on Film. Oxford University Press, 2016.

External links

Lorna Doone at TCMDB

1934 films
British black-and-white films
Films directed by Basil Dean
1930s historical drama films
British historical drama films
Films based on Lorna Doone
Films shot in England
Films set in Devon
Films set in London
Associated Talking Pictures
1934 drama films
1930s English-language films
1930s British films